The 2014 Survivor Series was the 28th annual Survivor Series professional wrestling pay-per-view and livestreaming event produced by WWE. It took place on November 23, 2014, at the Scottrade Center in St. Louis, Missouri, and was the first Survivor Series event to air on the WWE Network, which launched in February. The event was notable for the WWE debut appearance of former World Championship Wrestling (WCW) wrestler Sting and also the first Survivor Series since 2001 to not feature a world championship match.

Eight matches were contested at the event, including two on the Kickoff pre-show. The main event saw Team Cena (John Cena, Dolph Ziggler, Erick Rowan, Big Show, and Ryback) defeat Team Authority (Seth Rollins, Kane, Luke Harper, Mark Henry, and Rusev) in a 5-on-5 Survivor Series elimination match, with Ziggler emerging the lone survivor. Ziggler was the second wrestler to survive a 3-on-1 situation in a Survivor Series elimination match, eliminating Kane, Harper, and Rollins. The only other person to survive a 3-on-1 situation was Ric Flair at the 2006 event. The event had 100,000 buys (excluding WWE Network views), down from the previous year's 177,000 buys.

Production

Background
Survivor Series is an annual gimmick pay-per-view (PPV), produced every November by WWE since 1987. The second longest running pay-per-view event in history (behind WWE's WrestleMania), it is one of the promotion's original four pay-per-views, along with WrestleMania, Royal Rumble, and SummerSlam, collectively referred to as the "Big Four". The event is traditionally characterized by having Survivor Series matches, which are tag team elimination matches that typically pits teams of four or five wrestlers against each other. The 2014 event was the 28th event in the Survivor Series chronology and was scheduled to be held on November 23, 2014, at the Scottrade Center in St. Louis, Missouri. In addition to airing on traditional PPV, the event was available through WWE's online streaming service, the WWE Network, which launched in February, which made it the first Survivor Series to air on the WWE Network.

Storylines
The card consisted of eight matches, including two on the Kickoff pre-show. The matches resulted from scripted storylines, where wrestlers portrayed heroes, villains, or less distinguishable characters in scripted events that built tension and culminated in a wrestling match or series of matches, with results predetermined by WWE's writers. Storylines between the characters played out on WWE's primary television programs, Raw and SmackDown.

On the October 27 episode of Raw, after John Cena, the #1 contender for the WWE World Heavyweight Championship, rejected an offer to join The Authority, Triple H scheduled a traditional Survivor Series tag team elimination match, with a team representing The Authority facing a team captained by Cena. Later that night, it was hinted that Intercontinental Champion Dolph Ziggler had joined Team Cena; both Cena and Ziggler saved each other from post-match attacks. The next week on Raw, Vince McMahon announced that if Team Authority loses at Survivor Series, The Authority will be out of power (Triple H will be fired as COO; Kane will be fired as Director of Operations and Stephanie McMahon would no longer be a Principal Owner of WWE). Seth Rollins, Kane and Randy Orton joined Team Authority with Rollins as captain, while Ziggler joined Team Cena. Later that night, Orton was ejected by The Authority after he attacked members of The Authority, and turned face in the process for the first time since 2013. The next week on Raw, Rusev joined Team Authority after The Authority helped him retain the United States Championship from Sheamus. Sheamus joined Team Cena along with Big Show and Jack Swagger, while Mark Henry and Ryback joined Team Authority. But, by the end of the night, Swagger dropped out of Team Cena after Rollins injured him, while Ryback attacked and left Team Authority after Kane interfered in his main-event match against Cena. Luke Harper applied to join Team Authority by attacking Ziggler. The next week on Raw, Harper was confirmed as the final member of Team Authority. While Cena was scouting Ryback to fill out his team, team Authority attacked the rest of Team Cena, which played a part in Ziggler losing his Intercontinental Championship to Harper, and Sheamus dropping out of Team Cena after Mark Henry injured him. Later that night, Erick Rowan and Ryback joined Team Cena. On the November 21 episode of Smackdown, in response to comments made by Cena stating that he felt responsible for his team, Triple H announced that if Team Cena lost, all of Team Cena, except Cena himself, would be fired. Later that night, with Cena absent, Team Authority and a chair-wielding Triple H attacked the rest of Team Cena.

On the October 31 episode of SmackDown, Nikki Bella won a Battle Royal to face AJ Lee for the WWE Divas Championship. On November 10, WWE.com announced that AJ Lee would defend the title against Nikki at Survivor Series.

At Hell in a Cell, Bray Wyatt attacked Dean Ambrose during his Hell in a Cell match against Rollins. On the November 10 episode of Raw, it was announced that Ambrose would face Wyatt at Survivor Series.

On November 17, it was announced on WWE.com that WWE Tag Team Champions Gold and Stardust would defend the titles against The Miz and Damien Mizdow, The Usos, and Los Matadores in a Fatal 4-Way tag team match at Survivor Series.

On November 17, it was announced on WWE.com that the Survivor Series kickoff show would feature the return of Bad News Barrett from injury and Fandango, accompanied by Rosa Mendes, against an unknown opponent.

On November 18, it was announced on WWE.com that Alicia Fox, Natalya, Emma and Naomi would face Paige, Cameron, Layla and Summer Rae in a Survivor Series elimination tag team match at Survivor Series.

Event

Pre-show 
The analysis team was hosted by Renee Young and consisted of Alex Riley, Booker T, and special guest Paul Heyman.

During the Survivor Series Kickoff
pre-show, Fandango faced Justin Gabriel. Fandango executed a "The Last Dance" to win the match.

Later, Jack Swagger faced Cesaro. Swagger forced Cesaro to submit to the "Patriot Lock" to win the match.

Preliminary matches
The event began with Mr. McMahon calling The Authority and John Cena to the ring. He added the stipulation, that should Team Authority lose, the only person who can bring The Authority back to power would be Cena himself. Cena then responded by saying "there is no chance in hell" he would bring The Authority back to power.

The first match saw Gold and Stardust defend the Tag Team Championship against The Miz and Damien Mizdow, The Usos and Los Matadores. After Goldust was incapacitated by a "Samoan Splash" from an Uso, Mizdow stole the pin to win the titles for his team.

Next, Team Natalya (Alicia Fox, Emma, Naomi, and Natalya) faced Team Paige (Paige, Cameron, Layla, and Summer Rae) in a traditional 4-on-4 Survivor Series elimination tag team match. Cameron was eliminated by Naomi after Naomi pinned her with a bridging rolling reverse cradle pin. Layla was eliminated by Fox after a tilt-a-whirl backbreaker. Summer Rae was eliminated after Emma forced her to submit to the "Emma Lock". Paige was eliminated by Naomi after a handstand modified headscissors driver.

After that, Dean Ambrose faced Bray Wyatt. Ambrose was disqualified after he hit Wyatt with a chair. After the match, Ambrose attacked Wyatt with "Dirty Deeds" on the chair, a diving elbow drop through a table and buried Wyatt underneath a table and chairs and climbed a ladder.

In the fourth match, Adam Rose and The Bunny faced Slator Gator (Heath Slater and Titus O'Neil). The Bunny executed a missile dropkick on Slater to win the match.

Next, Michael Cole, Jerry Lawler, and John "Bradshaw" Layfield interviewed Roman Reigns via satellite, who announced he would return in late December.

In the fifth match, AJ Lee defended the Divas Championship against Nikki Bella. After Brie Bella kissed AJ, Nikki executed the "Rack Attack" on AJ to win the title.

Main event

In the main event, Team Cena (John Cena, Dolph Ziggler, Big Show, Erick Rowan, and Ryback) faced Team Authority (Seth Rollins, Kane, Mark Henry, Rusev, and Luke Harper) (with Triple H, Stephanie McMahon, Jamie Noble, Joey Mercury, and Lana) in a traditional 5-on-5 Survivor Series elimination tag team match. Henry was the first man eliminated by Big Show after a "KO Punch". Ryback was eliminated by Rusev after a Curb Stomp from Rollins and a jumping savate kick. Rusev tried to put Ziggler through a broadcast table with a splash but missed, fell through the table and was counted out. Rowan was eliminated by Harper after a discus clothesline. Cena was eliminated by Rollins after a KO Punch from Big Show, who betrayed Cena. Big Show shook Triple H's hand and walked out on the match, eliminating himself by countout and turning heel. Ziggler eliminated Kane with a "Zig Zag" and Harper with a schoolboy. Ziggler executed a Zig Zag on Rollins but Triple H pulled the referee out of the ring. The Authority attacked Ziggler, but he fought them off and executed a second Zig Zag on Rollins as another referee came out to the ring. Triple H attacked the other referee and attacked Ziggler, executing a "Pedigree" on him. He called out Scott Armstrong to count the pin, but WCW wrestler Sting appeared, making his WWE debut. Sting knocked out Armstrong and had a staredown with Triple H. Sting then executed a "Scorpion Death Drop" on Triple H and pulled Ziggler on top of Rollins for the pin and win. In the orders of the stipulation, Triple H was fired as the COO, Stephanie was no longer a principal owner of WWE and Kane lost his role as the Director of Operations (The Authority was removed from power). The show ended with Triple H and Stephanie heartbroken that they lost their power, and they realized that they were nothing better than the people that clean the floors and they realized that since they were fired from power, they lost the privilege to fly on the corporate jet to WWE events, and they can only work at WWE headquarters and no longer influence the careers and lives of the superstars. The fans chanted “Yes, Yes, Yes” and “You got fired!” Stephanie would throw a tantrum and not accept the results as she would cry as the event went off the air.

Reception
Survivor Series received generally positive reviews, with particular praise going toward the main event. Speaking of the Ambrose-Wyatt match, Larry Csonka of 411mania said "The match was good, and they set up next month so I really don’t have a lot of complaints with this." He gave the match ***3/4 (out of *****). He gave the main event ****, calling it "a very good main event presentation." He gave the entire event a score of 7 out of 10. The main event received the Slammy Award for match of the year 2014.

Aftermath
On the November 24 episode of Raw, Triple H and Stephanie McMahon bid farewell to the WWE Universe, but were interrupted by Daniel Bryan, who returned and served as the general manager for both Raw and SmackDown that week, putting members of Team Authority in unfavorable situations. Mark Henry was put in a match against Ryback, which he lost quickly. Luke Harper defended his Intercontinental Championship against Dean Ambrose, which ended in a disqualification due to Harper pushing Ambrose into the referee. Kane was put into concessions for the night as Concessions Kane. Rusev and Lana were forced to speak out the Pledge of Allegiance or defend the United States Championship in a Battle Royal, which Rusev did successfully on SmackDown. Seth Rollins lost a 3-on-2 handicap match against John Cena and Dolph Ziggler, with Jamie Noble and Joey Mercury chosen as his partners by fans poll. At the end of the show, it was announced that the Anonymous Raw General Manager would be returning the following week.

On the December 29 episode of Raw, after threatening to Curb Stomp guest host Edge (who had to retire due to multiple neck injuries that could leave him paralyzed), Rollins coaxed Cena into bringing back The Authority after just over a month of exile. The following week on Raw, The Authority rewarded Rollins by placing him in the WWE World Heavyweight Championship match at the Royal Rumble also involving Cena and defending champion Brock Lesnar. In the same show, the Authority had also gave out the pre-match stipulated consequences to Team Cena, firing Dolph Ziggler, Erick Rowan and Ryback. Later on January 19, 2015, on Raw, John Cena defeated Seth Rollins, Big Show and Kane in a 3-on-1 handicap match (with his #1 contendership on the line) with the help of Sting, and thus Ziggler, Rowan and Ryback managed to get their jobs back. On January 22, 2015, on SmackDown, Daniel Bryan welcomed Dolph Ziggler, Erick Rowan and Ryback to celebrate their return to the WWE. Dolph Ziggler, Erick Rowan, and Ryback would continue to team as a faction well into 2015 before going separate ways just before WrestleMania 31.

Results

Survivor Series elimination matches

References

External links
 Official website

2014
Events in St. Louis
2014 WWE Network events
2014 in Missouri
Professional wrestling in St. Louis
2014 WWE pay-per-view events
November 2014 events in the United States